Lacimicrobium is a Gram-negative, facultatively aerobic and motile  bacteria genus from the family of Alteromonadaceae with one known species (Lacimicrobium alkaliphilum). Lacimicrobium alkaliphilum has been isolated from the Lake Xiaochaidan in the Qaidam Basin in China.

References

Alteromonadales
Monotypic bacteria genera
Bacteria genera